Brzozowiec may refer to the following places:
Brzozowiec, Łódź Voivodeship (central Poland)
Brzozowiec, Lublin Voivodeship (east Poland)
Brzozowiec, Subcarpathian Voivodeship (south-east Poland)
Brzozowiec, Masovian Voivodeship (east-central Poland)
Brzozowiec, Greater Poland Voivodeship (west-central Poland)
Brzozowiec, Lubusz Voivodeship (west Poland)
Brzozowiec, Opole Voivodeship (south-west Poland)